Aleksei Valeryevich Morochko (born 16 December 1972) is a former Russian football player.

References

1972 births
Living people
Soviet footballers
Russian footballers
FC Spartak-UGP Anapa players
FC Chernomorets Novorossiysk players
Russian Premier League players
FC Dynamo Stavropol players
FC Arsenal Tula players
FC Shinnik Yaroslavl players
FC Metallurg Lipetsk players
FC Sodovik Sterlitamak players

Association football defenders